Hoplodrina ambigua, the Vine's rustic, is a moth of the family Noctuidae. It is found in the western Palearctic realm (central Europe, south Europe North Africa, Russia to Urals, south-west Siberia, Tuva, Altai Mountains, Tajikistan, Turkestan and in the Near East – Iraq, Iran, Afghanistan, and Pakistan).

Technical description and variation

The wingspan is 32–34 mm. The length of the forewings is 13–15 mm. Forewing greyish ochreous, sometimes uniformly washed with brownish; the lines and stigmata dark grey, the latter with pale annuli; submarginal line luteous preceded by a dark grey shade; hindwing dirty pale grey in male, darker in female, and darker in both sexes in the brown suffused forms: - the form sericea Speyer, from Holland and Germany, is described as having narrower silky grey forewings; -in [now full species levis Stgr.], from W. Turkestan and Asia Minor, the yellower ochreous tint is predominant and the dark markings are conspicuous but in some pale examples from Segovia, Spain- ab. ochrea ab. nov. [Warren] the dark markings tend to become effaced, the head, thorax, and forewings being pale yellow ochreous - amurensis Stgr. indicates small dark examples from Ussuri, Amurland.
Similar to and confused with Hoplodrina octogenaria and Hoplodrina blanda. Certain identification requires dissection of the genitalia.See Townsend et al.

Biology
The moth flies in two generations from early May to mid-October. .

Larva clay coloured, darker dorsally: the dorsal line itself fine and white with dark edges; the subdorsal also fine and pale; laterally a pale dark edged serrate line containing the spiracles. The larvae are polyphagous feeding on various herbaceous plants including Beta vulgaris, Cynara scolymus, Medicago sativa and Taraxacum officinale.

Notes
The flight season refers to Belgium and The Netherlands. This may vary in other parts of the range.

References

External links

Vine’s rustic at UKmoths
Funet Taxonomy
Fauna Europaea
Lepiforum.de
Vlindernet.nl 

Caradrinini
Moths described in 1775
Moths of Africa
Moths of Asia
Moths of Europe
Moths of the Middle East
Taxa named by Michael Denis
Taxa named by Ignaz Schiffermüller